"Enchule" (Puerto Rican slang for "a romantic obsession") is a song recorded by Puerto Rican singer Rauw Alejandro for his debut studio album, Afrodisíaco (2020). It was written by Alejandro, while the production was handled by Mr. Naisgai and Eydren con el Ritmo. The song was released for digital download and streaming by Sony Music Latin and Duars Entertainment on September 17, 2020, as the third single from the album. A Spanish language pop song, it was noted by the media for being different with Alejandro's usual reggaeton aesthetic, and is a love song, in which he expresses the feelings of the person on the stage where he know he has fallen in love.

"Enchule" received positive reviews from music critics, who complimented the singer's vocals. The track was nominated for La Coreo Más Hot at the 2021 Premios Juventud. It was commercially successful in Spain, reaching the top 10 in the country and being certified platinum. An accompanying music video, released simultaneously with the song, was directed by Gustavo "Gus" Camacho. It depicts Alejandro traveling to different parts of the world in the search of love. He is shown dancing in Tokyo streets, in front of the Eiffel Tower, near the Egyptian pyramids, and up in the clouds. His choreography was praised by the critics and the video was nominated for Best Latin Video Choreography at the 2020 Latin Music Official Italian Awards.

Background and release
In January 2020, Rauw Alejandro revealed the titles of four of his upcoming songs, including "Enchule". He explained that the song's title refers to "when you like something or someone to levels that only you think about it". In February 2020, he announced that he was working on his debut studio album Afrodisíaco. "Enchule" was released for digital download and streaming by Sony Music Latin and Duars Entertainment as the third single from Afrodisíaco on September 17, 2020. It was included as the fifth track on the album, released November 13, 2020. During an interview with Remezcla, he described the track as his "favorite song", stating that he "enjoyed this one so much".

Music and lyrics

Musically, "Enchule", which was noted by the media for being different with Alejandro's usual reggaeton aesthetic, is a Spanish language pop song, with elements of R&B and trap. It was written by Alejandro and produced by Mr. Naisgai and Eydren con el Ritmo. The track runs for a total of three minutes and five seconds. Lyrically, "Enchule" is a love song, in which Alejandro expresses the feelings of the person on the stage where he know he has fallen in love. The word "Enchule" is a Puerto Rican slang for a romantic obsession.

Reception

Critical 
Upon release, "Enchule" was met with positive reviews from music critics. Remezcla's Lucas Villa called Alejandro's voice "hypnotic" and described the song as "alluring". In 2022, Ernesto Lechner from Rolling Stone ranked the track as Alejandro's 12th-best song.

The track was nominated for La Coreo Más Hot at the 2021 Premios Juventud.

Commercial 
In Spain, "Enchule" debuted at number 43 on September 27, 2020. It subsequently peaked at number 10 on the chart issue dated November 1, 2020, becoming Alejandro's fifth top 10 hit in the country. The track was later certified platinum by the Productores de Música de España (PROMUSICAE), for track-equivalent sales of over 40,000 units in the country. In Latin America, the song experienced moderate chart success. It peaked at number 4 in Dominican Republic, number 21 in Paraguay, number 47 in Peru, and number 66 in Argentina. The song was also certified platinum+gold by the Asociación Mexicana de Productores de Fonogramas y Videogramas (AMPROFON), for track-equivalent sales of over 90,000 units in Mexico.

Promotion

Music video

An accompanying music video was released simultaneously with the song. The visual was directed by Venezuelan director Gustavo "Gus" Camacho, who had also directed the videos for Alejandro's previous singles "Fantasías", "Fantasías (Remix)", "Elegí", "Tattoo (Remix)", and "Elegí (Remix)". It depicts Alejandro traveling to different parts of the world in the search of love. He is shown dancing in Tokyo streets, in front of the Eiffel Tower, near the Egyptian pyramids, and up in the clouds. Remezcla's Lucas Villa gave the "dance-heavy" video a positive review, calling it "cute", while labeling Alejandro "a straight choreo killer". Happy FM staff described the video as "incredible", while MTV News staff called it "magical". The visual was nominated for Best Latin Video Choreography at the 2020 Latin Music Official Italian Awards.

Live performances
"Enchule" was included on the set lists for Alejandro's the Rauw Alejandro World Tour and the Vice Versa Tour.

Track listing

Credits and personnel
Credits adapted from Tidal.
 Rauw Alejandro associated performer, composer, lyricist
 Mr. Naisgai  producer
 Eydren con el Ritmo  producer

Charts

Weekly charts

Monthly charts

Certifications

Release history

References

2020 songs
2020 singles
Rauw Alejandro songs
Songs written by Rauw Alejandro
Sony Music Latin singles
Spanish-language songs